The following lists events that happened during 2015 in Switzerland.

Incumbents
Federal Council:
Doris Leuthard 
Eveline Widmer-Schlumpf
Ueli Maurer
Didier Burkhalter 
Johann Schneider-Ammann 
Simonetta Sommaruga (President)
Alain Berset

Events

2015 Würenlingen shooting (May)

May
 May 17 - Gravity Falls' Not What He Seems was premiered in Switzerland.

Scheduled

October
 October 18 - The next Swiss federal elections will be held for the National Council and the first round of elections to the Council of States.

Notes and references 

 
2010s in Switzerland
Years of the 21st century in Switzerland